K. S. Ashoka known as Ashoka is an Indian movie director, writer.. He became popular in the wake of the success of his debut movie 6-5=2 Kannada. It was the first found footage movie in Kannada.  with the grand success of the movie 6-5=2 Kannda version the same movie was Remade in Hindi  with same title 6-5=2 Hindi and released in 2014 by different director. In Telugu, it was dubbed and released as Chitram kadu nizam.  following the success of the movie 6-5=2. K S Ashoka directed second Movie name Dia which is critically acclaimed and was commercially successful as well.

Early life
With an Engineering degree from Sri Jayachamarajendra College of Engineering (SJCE) Mysuru, Ashoka was working In Citibank India where he found his colleague D Krishna Chaitanya as his first Movie 6-5=2 producer. following the success of the movie 6-5=2 they again collaborated to work together for the next movie Dia.

Filmography

Awards and nominations

References

External links
 

21st-century Indian film directors
Kannada film directors
Film directors from Bangalore
Living people
Screenwriters from Bangalore
1982 births